Costantino Lake is a lake in the province of Reggio, Calabria, Italy.

Lakes of Calabria